Omnia Mahmoud Abdelhamid Mahmoud (born 6 February 1994) is an Egyptian footballer who plays as a midfielder. She has been a member of the Egypt women's national team.

Club career
Mahmoud has played for Wadi Degla in Egypt.

International career
Mahmoud capped for Egypt at senior level during the 2016 Africa Women Cup of Nations.

References

1994 births
Living people
Egyptian women's footballers
Women's association football midfielders
Egypt women's international footballers